Jimmy Jean-Louis (born August 8, 1968) is a Haitian actor and producer. Born in Pétion-Ville, he moved to Paris at a young age with his family in search of a better life. His early roles were in French television commercials and Spanish musical theatre. Eventually settling in Los Angeles in the late 1990s, he had small roles in The Bourne Identity, Tears of the Sun and Arliss before breaking into larger roles in American television and film. He played the character of "the Haitian" on the NBC television series Heroes from 2006-2009.  He played the title character in the 2012 French telefilm Toussaint Louverture.

Early life 
Jimmy Jean-Louis was born in Pétion-Ville, near Port-au-Prince, Haiti. He lived there until the age of twelve, when he moved to Paris with his family to pursue a modeling career. After moving he experienced a culture shock because of the rural to city lifestyle change. He enrolled in business courses, but quickly realized that his heart lay in performance, and studied at the Académie Internationale de la Danse. His parents returned to Haiti, but Jean-Louis and his brother remained in Paris. Around a decade later in 1991, producers discovered Jean-Louis during one of his dancing stints in a French club. They tapped him to appear in a Coca-Cola advertisement, the success of which prompted Jean-Louis to spend several years modeling across Europe. In London he worked for brands including Gianfranco Ferré and Valentino. Before finding success as a model, he was homeless at times in Paris. By the mid-'90s, he had appeared in music videos for Ophelie Winter, En Vogue, Mariah Carey, Seal, and George Michael. He also began appearing in low-budget independent films in Los Angeles.

Acting career 
He worked in musical theatre in Barcelona, Spain, spending three years with musical theater "La Belle Epoque", before moving to Italy where he worked as a model. He had secondary roles in Tears of the Sun, Hollywood Homicide, Monster-in-Law and The Game of Their Lives. He was cast as the romantic lead in the 2006 film Phat Girlz starring opposite Mo'Nique as her love interest. He was cast in the recurring role of The Haitian on the NBC television series Heroes, playing a character who is an associate of Noah Bennet. In an interview on The Post Show on G4, Jean-Louis stated that the Haitian was originally supposed to be from New Zealand, and that the character was going to be named "The Kiwi". He stated that he auditioned three times for the role of D.L. Hawkins, a part which he did not get. 

In 2013, it was announced that Jean-Louis had been cast in a recurring role in Arrow. He portrayed "The Captain", an associate of Professor Ivo. In 2015, he took on a supporting role in the British film, The Cursed Ones. He had a recurring role on season one of Claws but was upgraded to a starring role in season 2. 

In 2018, he was a jury member at the Monte-Carlo Television Festival and Angouleme Film Festival. In 2019 he both produced and starred in 'Rattlesnakes', based on the stage play by Graham Farrow.

Personal life 
Jean-Louis and his wife Evelyn have three children. He enjoys watching and playing soccer and is a member of an amateur soccer club Hollywood United F.C., a team consisting mostly of celebrities and former professionals. He is fluent in five languages: English, French, Spanish, Italian, and Haitian Creole.

Jean-Louis received the key to Miami-Dade County on January 10, 2010 from Mayor Carlos Alvarez. He also received the key to the city of North Miami on May 3, 2018 from Mayor Joseph Smith.

He is a patron of the BrandAID Project.

2010 Haiti earthquake efforts 
After the 2010 Haiti earthquake, Jean-Louis went to Haiti to search for his elderly parents in Haiti the day after a powerful earthquake struck the nation. Jean-Louis learned that a house he had grown up in collapsed, killing several of his relatives. He is the founder of Hollywood Unites for Haiti, a non-profit charitable aid organization whose original mission was to provide sports and cultural education to underprivileged youth on the island. The group mobilized for disaster relief after the magnitude-7 earthquake. Jean-Louis has taken part in a series of campaigns for Haitian aid, such as singing in the "We Are The World" remake of the original for Haiti in February 2010 which aired during the start of the Olympic Games in Vancouver. As the Ambassador of the Pan American Development Foundation for Haitian children, Jean-Louis testified to the United States Congress on their behalf in 2010.

Jean-Louis was named Ambassador-at-large to Haiti by President Michel Martelly in 2014.

Awards

 2012 Best Actor Nomination (Toussaint Louverture (film)) - Monte-Carlo Television Festival
 2012 Best Actor Nomination (Toussaint Louverture (film)) - African Movie Academy Awards
 2012 MPAH Haiti Movie Awards Honorary Award * Motion Picture Association of Haiti
 2012 Meilleur Acteur - Festival Vues_d’Afrique
 2012 Best Actor Toussaint Louverture (film) - Pan African Film Festival
 2013 Excellence in the Arts prize - Caribbean American Heritage Award www.caribbeanheritageawards.org
 2015 Best Documentary Nomination (Jimmy Goes to Nollywood) - Monte-Carlo Television Festival
 2015 Best Documentary Nomination (Jimmy Goes to Nollywood) - African Movie Academy Awards 
 2017 Best Supporting Actor - Hollywood African Prestigious Awards
 2019 Career Achievement Award - Montreal International Black Film Festival
 2019 Meilleur Acteur de la Diaspora Africaine (Desrances) - Sotigui Awards
 2019 Sotigui D’Or - Sotigui Awards
 2019 Impact In Entertainment Award - Face2Face Africa
 2020 Best Actor Win at the Africa Movie Academy Awards

Filmography

References

External links 

Official home page

Interview with Jimmy Jean-Louis from The Company Podcast
Jean-Louis' non-profit charitable aid organization Hollywood Unites for Haiti
Jimmy Jean-Louis @ ECI Global Talent Management

1968 births
Living people
Haitian male actors
Haitian male models
Haitian footballers
American male actors
Hollywood United players
People from Port-au-Prince
Haitian emigrants to the United States
20th-century male actors
21st-century Haitian male actors
20th-century Haitian people
Association footballers not categorized by position